Bhakti Chaitanya Swami (born 14 August 1951 in Auckland, New Zealand) is a Gaudiya Vaishnava swami and a religious leader of the International Society for Krishna Consciousness (also known as the Hare Krishna movement or ISKCON). He is a member of its Governing Body Commission and is the leader of ISKCON in South Africa, the Baltic states and Russia.

He was born as Richard Naismith on 14 August 1951 in Auckland, New Zealand. In 1972 he first met ISKCON founder A. C. Bhaktivedanta Swami Prabhupada in Auckland University. A year later he joined that society in London and received initiation from Prabhupada, who gave him the sanskrit name of Raghubhir Dasa.

The swami is closely associated with the educational programs of ISKCON and teaches at the Vaisnava Institute for Higher Education in Vrindavana. In 1994, during the Gaura Purnima Festival, he took the renounced order of sannyasa from Giriraja Swami and received the name Bhakti Caitanya Swami. Later he became a member of its Governing Body Commission and ISKCON Guru.

See also
 List of ISKCON members and patrons

Footnotes

References
 
 
 
 
 
 
 
 
 
 
 
 
 

Living people
Converts to Hinduism
International Society for Krishna Consciousness religious figures
New Zealand Hindus
University of Auckland alumni
1951 births
Devotees of Krishna
Hare Krishnas